Sondra James (July 21, 1939 – September 12, 2021) was an American sound coordinator and actress.

Early life
Sondra James was born Sondra Weil on July 21, 1939, in the Lower East Side, New York City. She graduated from the Bronx High School of Science in 1955 before taking a double major in anthropology and archeology at City College of New York.

Career 
James began work as an actor, first starring in Mighty Aphrodite in 1995. Following this, she consistently worked as a character actor and voice actress across film, television, and stage, including the national tour of Funny Girl in 1996. In the 1990s, she founded the loop recording company Speakeasy, which provides audio recording for film and television. Within Speakeasy, James took on various sound department roles, including loop coordinator, voice casting, and ADR casting. She was often involved with casting Coen brothers films. As of 2021, the company has provided audio for over 500 films and television shows. James also provided additional voices for several of the productions the company looped. While James and Speakeasy were successful in the 1990s, she was often upset that she struggled to find acting jobs.

James played the main role of Auntie Norma in Karl Pilkington's British comedy Sick of It; the production decided to use an American actress because there were limited elderly British actors, and these would all be recognizable to a British audience, which Pilkington felt would be distracting. He was shown a picture of James and immediately liked the look of her, knowing he didn't want the character to appear mundane.

In 2020, she was one of the group of actors who brought a class-action lawsuit against SAG-AFTRA Health Fund for imposing penalties on performers over 65 in a health plan restructure supposedly helping cover COVID-19.

Personal life 
James had two sons, Michael and Marc. She had five grandchildren and two great-grandchildren at the time of her death. She was a fan of the New York Yankees.

Death 
James died at her home in New York City on September 12, 2021, aged 82, from lung cancer, which had been diagnosed five months earlier.

Filmography

Film 

Sourced to BFI and TV Guide unless noted

Television
Sourced to Deadline and TV Guide unless noted

Commercials

Video games
Sourced to Anime News Network unless noted

Stage 
Sourced to The Hollywood Reporter unless noted

As sound department

Film
Sourced to BFI unless noted

Television
Sourced to Deadline unless noted

References

External links

1939 births
2021 deaths
Actresses from New York City
The Bronx High School of Science alumni
Businesspeople from New York City
City College of New York alumni
People from the Lower East Side
21st-century American women
Jewish American actresses
New York (state) Democrats
American stage actresses
American film actresses
American television actresses
American voice actresses